Bristol is an independent city in the Commonwealth of Virginia. As of the 2020 census, the population was 17,219. It is the twin city of Bristol, Tennessee, just across the state line, which runs down the middle of its main street, State Street. It is surrounded on three sides by Washington County, Virginia, which is combined with the city for statistical purposes. Bristol is a principal city of the Kingsport–Bristol–Bristol, TN-VA Metropolitan Statistical Area, which is a component of the Johnson City–Kingsport–Bristol, TN-VA Combined Statistical Area – commonly known as the "Tri-Cities" region.

History

Evan Shelby first appeared in what is now the Bristol area around 1765. In 1766, Shelby moved his family and settled at a place called Big Camp Meet (now Bristol, Tennessee/Virginia). It is said that Cherokee Indians once inhabited the area and the Indian village was named, according to legend, because numerous deer and buffalo met here to feast in the canebrakes. Shelby renamed the site Sapling Grove (which would later be changed to Bristol).  In 1774, Shelby erected a fort on a hill overlooking what is now downtown Bristol. It was an important stopping-off place for notables such as Daniel Boone and George Rogers Clark, as well as hundreds of pioneers' en route to the interior of the developing nation. This fort, known as Shelby's Station was actually a combination trading post, way station, and stockade.

By the mid-nineteenth century, when surveyors projected a junction of two railroad lines at the Virginia-Tennessee state line, Reverend James King conveyed much of his acreage to his son-in-law, Joseph R. Anderson. Anderson laid out the original town of Bristol, Tennessee/Virginia and building began in 1853.

Samuel Goodson, who owned land that adjoined the original town of Bristol TN/VA at its northern boundary (Beaver Creek was the dividing line), started a development known as Goodsonville.  Anderson was unable to incorporate Bristol across the state lines of Tennessee and Virginia.  In 1856, Goodsonville and the original Bristol, Virginia were merged to form the composite town of Goodson, Virginia.

Incorporation for Bristol, Tennessee and Goodson, Virginia occurred in 1856. The Virginia and Tennessee Railroads reached the cities in the late summer of 1856. Due to having two different railroads companies, two depots served the cities; one in Bristol, Tenn. and the other in Goodson, Va. However, the depot located in Goodson continued to be referred to as Bristol, Virginia. In 1890, Goodson, Virginia once again took the name Bristol.

The Grove, Solar Hill Historic District, and Walnut Grove are listed on the National Register of Historic Places.

Geography
Bristol is in southwestern Virginia. It is bordered to the west, north, and east by Washington County, Virginia, and to the south by the city of Bristol in Sullivan County, Tennessee.

Little Creek and Beaver Creek flow south through the city; Little Creek flows into Beaver Creek two blocks south of the state line in Tennessee. Beaver Creek is a tributary of the South Fork Holston River.

The city is served by Interstates 81 and 381, and by U.S. Routes 11, 19, 58, and 421. I-81 leads northeast  to Roanoke, Virginia, and southwest  to Knoxville, Tennessee. Interstate 381 (I-381) is a spur from Interstate 81 that provides access to Bristol, Virginia, United States. The I-81 interchange, the only one on I-381, is signed as exits 1A (I-81 north) and 1B (I-81 south). US 11 and US 19, running parallel to I-81, lead northeast  to Abingdon, Virginia. US 11 splits into routes 11W and 11E in Bristol; US 11W leads west-southwest  to Kingsport, Tennessee, while US 11E and US 19 lead south-southwest  to Johnson City, Tennessee. US 58 runs with I-81 northeast for  before splitting off to the east just beyond Abingdon; US 58 and 421 together lead west  to Weber City, Virginia. US 421 leads southeast  to Mountain City, Tennessee.

Climate 
According to the Köppen climate classification, Bristol has a marine west coast climate abbreviated as Cfb.

Demographics

2020 census

Note: the US Census treats Hispanic/Latino as an ethnic category. This table excludes Latinos from the racial categories and assigns them to a separate category. Hispanics/Latinos can be of any race.

2000 Census
As of the census of 2000, there were 17,367 people, 7,678 households, and 4,798 families residing in the city.  The population density was 1,346.4 people per square mile (519.8/km2).  There were 8,469 housing units at an average density of 656.6 per square mile (253.5/km2).  The racial makeup of the city was 92.54% White, 5.57% Black or African American, 0.25% Native American, 0.37% Asian, 0.01% Pacific Islander, 0.18% from other races, and 1.08% from two or more races.  0.97% of the population were Hispanic or Latino of any race.

There were 7,678 households, out of which 24.8% had children under the age of 18 living with them, 46.1% were married couples living together, 13.6% had a female householder with no husband present, and 37.5% were non-families. 34.3% of all households were made up of individuals, and 17.4% had someone living alone who was 65 years of age or older.  The average household size was 2.18 and the average family size was 2.78.

In the city, the population was spread out, with 20.3% under the age of 18, 8.6% from 18 to 24, 26.2% from 25 to 44, 24.4% from 45 to 64, and 20.5% who were 65 years of age or older.  The median age was 41 years. For every 100 females, there were 82.0 males.  For every 100 females age 18 and over, there were 75.9 males.

The median income for a household in the city was $27,389, and the median income for a family was $34,266. Males had a median income of $28,420 versus $20,967 for females. The per capita income for the city was $17,311.  About 13.2% of families and 16.2% of the population were below the poverty line, including 25.8% of those under age 18 and 12.4% of those age 65 or over.

Government 

January 1, 2023 to January 1, 2024:

Government
 Mayor: Neal Osborne
 Vice Mayor: Becky Nave
 Council Member: Anthony Farnum
 Council Member: Jake Holmes
 Council Member: Michael Pollard
 City Manager: Randall C. Eads
 City Attorney: Randall C. Eads
 Clerk of Court: Kelly Duffy (I)
 Commissioner of Revenue: Cloe Eva Barker (D)
 Commonwealth’s Attorney: Jerry Wolfe (R)
 Sheriff: Tyrone Foster (I)
 Treasurer: Angel Britt (R)

Past mayors

 James Rector, 1984-1992
 Jerry Wolfe, 1992-1997
 Farham Jarrard, 1997-2000
 Jerry Wolfe, 2000-2001
 Douglas R. Weberling, 2001-2003
 Jerry Wolfe, 2003-2004
 Paul W. Hurley, 2004-2005
 Douglas R. Weberling, 2005-2006
 C. Farnham Jarrard, 2006-2007
 James Rector, 2007-2010
 Don Ashley, 2010-2011
 Ed Harlow, 2011-2012
 Jim Steele, 2012-2013
 Guy Odum, 2013-2014
 Catherine Brillhart, 2014-2015 (first female mayor)
 Archie Hubbard, III, 2015-2016
 Bill Hartley, 2016-2017
 Kevin Mumpower, 2017-2019
 Neal Osborne, 2019-2020
 Bill Hartley, 2020-2021
 Anthony Farnum, 2021-2023

Police

Bristol is served by two law enforcement agencies: the city police and the city sheriff's department.  Supporting the department is the city's E-911 Central Dispatch Emergency Communication Center which provides call taking and dispatch service for police, fire and EMS needs.

Technology 
Despite its relatively small size, Bristol, Virginia, boasts one of the more advanced broadband networks in the country. BVU Authority (formerly Bristol Virginia Utilities or BVU) started planning a fiber optic deployment in the city in the late 1990s. By 2001, BVU had been granted approval by the city council for a full deployment of a Fiber to the premises (FTTP or FTTU, fiber to the user) project. This project was to offer competition to local incumbents and provide broadband Internet, cable TV, and telephone service to the residents of Bristol. This deployment was one of the first of its kind in the United States and was widely watched by the telecommunications industry. A system known as Passive optical network (PON) was successfully deployed to over 6,000 customers in a matter of two years.

In 2003, in the relatively isolated city of Bristol, Virginia, BVU, created a nonprofit division called "Optinet", a municipal broadband Internet service that covers Bristol as well as the Southwest portion of the state of Virginia. Serving around 12,500 customers, BVU is recognized as the "first municipal utility in the United States to deploy an all-fiber network offering the triple play of video, voice and data services". On October 29, 2009, BVU received US$3.5 million in grant funding from the Virginia Tobacco Indemnification and Community Revitalization Commission. With these funds BVU will build "an additional 49 miles of its OptiNet fiber-optic backbone from Abingdon up I-81 to Virginia Route 16 from Marion into Grayson County". This will also allow for BVU to make a second connection with Mid Atlantic Broadband, increasing communication between different businesses in Northern Virginia. The Virginia Tobacco Community funded this project because it provided their business with more connections in crucial areas of the southwest and southern part of Virginia.

The U.S. Department of Commerce also funded BVU. On July 3, 2010, it was reported that they gave US$22.7 million in stimulus funds to Southwest Virginia to create a "388-mile optic backbone through an eight-county region". This project will service over 120 institutions, such as schools, hospitals, government buildings, and many more besides. This new municipals broadband service will also be within a two-mile distance of over 500 different businesses. This project also created 295 new jobs. BVU Optinet continues operate a strong municipal broadband Internet service for Bristol and many other counties in Virginia.

Bristol's twin city in Tennessee has deployed an FTTP system similar to its neighbor across the state line.

On August 2, 2018, BVU Authority completed a sale of the OptiNet FTTP network to a private company, Sunset Digital of Duffield, Virginia for $50 M. The sale began in late 2015 and was publicly announced in early 2016. Along with the sale of OptiNet, BVU's joint network with Cumberland Plateau Co. was sold to Sunset Digital. In addition to the network assets, Sunset agreed to hire approximately 75 BVU employees from BVU.

Transportation

Air transport
The Tri-Cities Regional Airport, with approximately 195,000 annual passengers, is 19 miles to the southwest of Bristol.

Highways
U.S. Route 11, U.S. Route 19 and U.S. Route 421 run through the city.

Rail
Until 1970 the Southern Railway ran a couple of trains through the city, making stops at Bristol station, the last trains being the Birmingham Special and the Pelican. Until 1968 the Memphis-bound Tennessean made a stop in the city. 

A local coalition began advocating for Amtrak service around 2010, and local interest grew following the extension of Northeast Regional service to Roanoke in 2017. A study in 2019 concluded that a further extension to Bristol via Wytheville and Christiansburg could be financially viable but would require $30 million in track improvements between Bristol and Roanoke. In 2020, Gov. Ralph Northam described Amtrak service to Bristol as a "logical step" but said that it would be conditional upon the replacement of the Long Bridge with a higher-throughput rail crossing of the Potomac River.

Economy

Top employers
According to Bristol's 2011 Comprehensive Annual Financial Report, the top employers in the city are:

Education
In 2007 and 2008, Bristol was named one of the Best 100 Communities for Music Education

The city school division, Bristol Virginia Public Schools, operates Virginia High School and Virginia Middle School, together with four elementary schools: Highland View, Stonewall Jackson, Van Pelt, and Washington Lee.  Three private schools — St. Anne Catholic, Sullins Academy, and Morrison — are operated within the city.  Bristol was formerly home to two post-secondary institutions, Sullins College and Virginia Intermont College, but these colleges closed in 1978 and 2014 respectively.

School Board Members
 Chair: Randy Alvis
 Vice Chair: Breanne Forbes Hubbard
 Member: Steve Fletcher
 Member: Frank Goodpasture, III
 Member: Vanessa Guffey
 Superintendent: Keith Perrigan

Culture

"Birthplace of Country Music" 
Bristol was recognized as the "Birthplace of Country Music", according to a resolution passed by the US Congress in 1998; residents of the city had contributed to early country music recordings and influence, and the Birthplace of Country Music Museum is located in Bristol.

In 1927 record producer Ralph Peer of Victor Records began recording local musicians in Bristol to attempt to capture the local sound of traditional "folk" music of the region. One of these local sounds was created by the Carter Family. The Carter Family got their start on July 31, 1927, when A.P. Carter and his family journeyed from Maces Spring, Virginia, to Bristol, Tennessee, to audition for Peer who was seeking new talent for the relatively embryonic recording industry. They received $50 for each song they recorded.

Since 1994, the Birthplace of Country Music Alliance has promoted the city as a destination to learn about the history of the region and its role in the creation of an entire music genre. The Alliance is organizing the building of a new Cultural Heritage Center to help educate the public about the history of country music in the region.

Professional sports 
Bristol hosted the Bristol Pirates baseball team of the Appalachian League from 1969 to 2020. In conjunction with a contraction of Minor League Baseball beginning with the 2021 season, the Appalachian League was reorganized as a collegiate summer baseball league, and the Pirates were replaced by a new franchise named the Bristol State Liners in the revamped league designed for rising college freshman and sophomores.

Former NASCAR driver Kelly Denton is from the city.

On the Tennessee side, Bristol is home to Bristol Motor Speedway, the "world's fastest half mile", which hosts two NASCAR CUP SERIES races , two races per year on the NASCAR Xfinity Series and one race per year on the GANDER RV and OUTDOORS Truck Series, and various other racing events. The complex includes the Bristol Dragway, nicknamed "Thunder Valley", referencing the hills that echo the engine noise back toward the crowd.

Media 
Television:
 WCYB-TV in Bristol, VA (NBC Channel 5)
 WEMT-TV in Bristol, VA (Fox Channel 39)
 WJHL-TV in Johnson City, TN (CBS Channel 11; ABC on DT2)

Newspaper:
 Bristol Herald Courier

Radio:

 WEXX 99.3 FM
 WAEZ 94.9 FM
 WXBQ 96.9 FM
 WKJV 106.5 FM
 WZAP 690 AM
 WWTB 980 AM
 WOPI 1490 AM
 WIGN 1550 AM
 WBCM-LP 100.1

Notable people
 

Robert E. Clay (1875–1961), educator

See also
 National Register of Historic Places listings in Bristol, Virginia

References

External links

 City of Bristol official website
 Bristol Convention & Visitors Bureau

 
Bristol, Virginia
Bristol, Virginia
Bristol, Virginia
Kingsport–Bristol metropolitan area
Southwest Virginia